The Fox Motel House was a historic house on Arkansas Highway 367 in Bald Knob, Arkansas.  Located on the northwest side, near the junction with United States Route 64, it was a single-story wood-frame structure with Craftsman styling.  It had a porch extending across the front, with wooden posts on brick piers supporting it, and a spreading dormer projecting from the roof above.  The dormer had broad eaves with exposed rafter tails.  Built about 1925, it was one of Bald Knob's best examples of Craftsman architecture.

The house was listed on the National Register of Historic Places in 1992.  It has been listed as destroyed in the Arkansas Historic Preservation Program database.

See also
National Register of Historic Places listings in White County, Arkansas

References

Houses on the National Register of Historic Places in Arkansas
Houses completed in 1925
Houses in White County, Arkansas
National Register of Historic Places in White County, Arkansas
Buildings and structures in Bald Knob, Arkansas
1925 establishments in Arkansas
American Craftsman architecture in Arkansas
Bungalow architecture in Arkansas
Former buildings and structures in Arkansas